The Latvia women's national tennis team represents Latvia in Fed Cup tennis competition and are governed by the Latvian Tennis Union. They currently compete in World Group II.

History
Latvia competed in its first Fed Cup in 1992.  Their best result was reaching the round of 16 in 1993.  Prior to 1992, Latvian players represented the Soviet Union. Larisa Savchenko holds the record for most doubles win (38) in Fed Cup. She achieved this record while playing for both Latvia and the Soviet Union.

Current team (2019)
Jeļena Ostapenko
Anastasija Sevastova
Diāna Marcinkēviča
Daniela Vismane
Patrīcija Špaka

Results

1992–1999

2000–2009

2010–2019

See also
Fed Cup
Latvia Davis Cup team

External links

Billie Jean King Cup teams
Fed Cup
Fed Cup